650 Amalasuntha is a minor planet orbiting the Sun that was discovered by German astronomer August Kopff on October 4, 1907, at Heidelberg. It was named after Amalasuntha, the queen of the Ostrogoths from 526 to 534 AD.
The name may have been inspired by the asteroid's provisional designation 1907 AM.

Photometric observations of this asteroid during 2007 at the Organ Mesa Observatory in Las Cruces, New Mexico, were used to create a light curve plot. This showed a rotation period of 16.582 ± 0.001 hours and a brightness variation of 0.44 ± 0.03 magnitude during each cycle.

References

External links 
 
 

Nysa asteroids
Amalasuntha
Amalasuntha
Unclassifiable asteroids (Tholen)
19071004